Neoarctus primigenius is a species of tardigrade. It is the only species in the genus Neoarctus, which is the only genus in the family Neoarctidae. The genus and species were first described and named by Grimaldi de Zio, D'Addabbo Gallo and Morone De Lucia in 1992. The authors first placed the genus in the family Stygarctidae, but it was moved to a separate family in 1998.

Description
The female holotype is 99 μm long and 36 μm wide.

Distribution
The species has been found at 38 metres depth on the east coast of the island of Sardinia, in the Gulf of Orosei which is part of the Tyrrhenian Sea.

References

Further reading

Arthrotardigrada
Fauna of Sardinia
Endemic fauna of Italy
Animals described in 1992